Robin White was the defending champion, but did not compete this year.

Janine Thompson won the title by defeating Catherine Suire 6–1, 6–4 in the final.

Seeds

Draw

Finals

Top half

Bottom half

References

External links
 Official results archive (ITF)

Virginia Slims of Pennsylvania
1986 Virginia Slims World Championship Series